Airports in Ryazan are:

 Dyagilevo
 Protasovo air base
 Turlatovo Airport